Syms may refer to:

Sy Syms School of Business at Yeshiva University
Robert Syms (born 1956), English politician
Sy Syms (1926–2009), American businessman
Sylvia Syms (1934–2023), English actress
Sylvia Syms (1917–1992), American singer
Syms Corporation, a clothing store founded by Sy Syms

See also

 SIMS (disambiguation)